Foot strike may refer to:
 Foot strike (gait) – how the foot contacts the ground when walking or running.
 A strike (attack) using the foot, such as a kick.